Pearrygin Lake State Park is a public recreation area in the Methow Valley located  east of Winthrop in Okanogan County, Washington. The state park covers  that almost entirely surround Pearrygin Lake, giving it  of shoreline. Park activities include camping, boating, fishing, swimming, water sports, and cross-country skiing. The park's hiking trails include the  Rex Derr trail, which is named for a former director of the State Parks and Recreation Commission.

References

External links
Pearrygin Lake State Park Washington State Parks and Recreation Commission 
Pearrygin Lake State Park Map Washington State Parks and Recreation Commission

Parks in Okanogan County, Washington
State parks of Washington (state)
Protected areas established in 1959